Distortion is the first solo studio album by American musician Joseph "Rev. Run" Simmons from hip hop group Run–D.M.C. It was originally scheduled to be released in 2003, but was delayed until its release date of October 18, 2005. Production was handled entirely by Whiteboy and Rev Run, who also served as executive producer together with his brother Russell Simmons. The album debuted at 78 on the Top R&B/Hip-Hop Albums chart in the United States. Its lead single "Mind on the Road" peaked at 98 on the Pop 100.

Critical reception

Distortion was met with generally favorable reviews from critics. At Metacritic, which assigns a weighted average rating out of 100 to reviews from mainstream publications, this release received an average score of 61, based on eight reviews.

Mojo reviewer wrote that Rev Run's "bellowed cadences are as timeless and elemental as the blues". AllMusic's David Jeffries wrote: "The skimpy run time is noticeable and downright perplexing coming from an album that ambitiously delivers otherwise". Steve 'Flash' Juon of RapReviews.com wrote: "I cautiously recommend Distortion to Run-D.M.C. fans as being a lot better than their unceremonious disaster of a final album Crown Royal while openly admitting anybody younger than 18 may not relate to it and pass right on by to something else". Q reviewer stated: "yet for all the nostalgia, the lurching strut of tracks such as "Boom Ditty" and "Breaktime" remains undeniably potent and contemporary".

In mixed reviews, Blender critic wrote: "despite the occasional misstep... it's a welcome album to anyone who wishes the past 15 years never happened to Run-D.M.C.'s legacy". Sean Fennessey of Pitchfork summarized with: "this album is almost a non-entity". Rolling Stone reviewer wrote: "a CD of biblical rap would have been vastly more interesting than just tepid updates of the Run-DMC sound".

In a negative review, Entertainment Weekly writer described the album as "an awkward attempt that neither improves upon nor updates the trio's original blueprint".

Track listing

Personnel
Joseph "Run" Simmons – main artist, producer, executive producer
Timothy Lavigne – bass (track 5), guitar (track 10)
Joseph "Whiteboy" Kuleszynski – percussion (track 9), producer, recording, mixing (tracks: 2, 4, 5, 7)
Biff – percussion (track 9)
Jason Goldstein – mixing (tracks: 1, 3, 6, 8-10)
Howie Weinberg – mastering
Russell Simmons – executive producer, A&R
Louis Marino – art direction, design
Nichell Delvaille – art coordinator, photography
Joseph Cultice – photography
Doug Joswick – packaging
Adrienne Muhammad – A&R
Tony Austin – A&R

Charts

References

External links

2005 debut albums
Joseph Simmons albums
Russell Simmons Music Group albums